This is the list of episodes of the Gerry Anderson television series Joe 90, filmed by Century 21 Productions for ITC Entertainment and first broadcast from 1968 to 1969 on Associated Television. Episodes are listed in the recommended broadcast order as published by ITC. Air dates are the original broadcast dates on ATV unless otherwise stated.

Main Series (1968–69)

Compilation film
In 1981, a compilation film was released comprising re-edited versions of four of the original episodes.

References

External links

List of Joe 90 episodes at Fanderson.org.uk
List of Joe 90 episodes at BigRat.co.uk
List of Joe 90 episodes at TheVervoid.com

 
Lists of British science fiction television series episodes